Latirus gibbulus, common name the gibbose latirus, is a species of sea snail, a marine gastropod mollusc in the family Fasciolariidae, the spindle snails, the tulip snails and their allies.

Description
The size of the shell varies between 50 mm and 115 mm.

Distribution
This marine species occurs in the Indo-West Pacific.

References

External links
  Lyons W.G. & Snyder M.A. (2013) The genus Pustulatirus Vermeij and Snyder, 2006 (Gastropoda: Fasciolariidae: Peristerniinae) in the western Atlantic, with descriptions of three new species. Zootaxa 3636(1): 035–058
 

Fasciolariidae
Gastropods described in 1791